The Kawasaki KE100 is a dual-sport motorcycle that was produced by  Kawasaki  from 1976 to 2001. A direct successor to the G5, the major changes on the KE100 were different ergonomics and a change in transmission layout (1-N-2-3-4-5 to the G5's N-1-2-3-4-5). The KE100 did not change much through the years, although minor changes were made to the engine and transmission over successive model years, as well as a switch to different tanks after the B4 model. It uses an oil injection system that Kawasaki calls superlube to both eliminate fuel-mixing and give a precise fuel-oil mixture in the two-stroke cycle, reducing emissions enough that the KE100 still passes US emissions tests.

KE100
Dual-sport motorcycles
Two-stroke motorcycles
Motorcycles introduced in 1974